Cahul County was a county in Moldova from 1998 to 2003, with the seat at Cahul. Its population in 2002 was 179,209.

The county bordered Romania (west) and Ukraine (southeast), with the Moldovan counties of Lăpuşna and Taraclia County (in the Autonomous Territorial Unit of Gagauzia).

Description 
Cahul County was formed in 1998 on the territory of the former Moldovan districts of Cahul, Cantemir and Vulcănești.

Geographically, the county was located in Prutul de Jos Plain, the Western Black Sea Plain, and Tigheci Plateau.

History
On 22 October 1999, part of Cahul County was detached and established as Taraclia County.

References

 Counties of Moldova, Statoids.com

Counties of Moldova
Counties of Bessarabia
1998 establishments in Moldova
2003 disestablishments in Moldova
States and territories established in 1998
States and territories disestablished in 2003